Precious Death was a Southern California heavy metal band from the 1990s. The group was known for intense live shows that won over the local scene in L.A. before broadening their audience the rest of the country. They were a regular favorite at KNAC nights, on the Hollywood strip, and at summer music festivals. The group wrote songs with a Christian message. Singer Christopher Scott and guitarist David Bishop went on to form Blackball as a side project. Precious Death won album of the year and rock song of the year at the LA Music Awards and was nominated for Dove awards. The band's album, Southpaw, was ranked in one of the Top 10 essential Christian metal albums by Loudersound.

Members
 Christopher Scott - vocals (Blackball) (1990–present)
 David Bishop - guitars (Blackball) (1990–present)
 Roger Sampson - drums (Once Dead) (1990–present)
Andy Koehler - bass (1990-present)
Jerry Metalone - guitars (1990)

Discography
Studio albums
Our Stinkin Demo (1992)
Southpaw (1993)
If You Must (1994)
Precious Death (New Music For The Quiet Revolution) (1996)
The Greatest Hits: Volume One (2021)
The Greatest Hits: Volume Two (2021)
Oddballs and Endings: Things left unsaid (2021)

References

American Christian metal musical groups
Musical groups established in 1992

External links
 Precious Death